Ursinus College is a private liberal arts college in Collegeville, Pennsylvania. It was founded in 1869 and occupies a 170-acre campus.

History

19th century

In 1867, members of the German Reformed Church began plans to establish a college where "young men could be liberally educated under the benign influence of Christianity." The founders hoped to establish an alternative to the seminary at Mercersburg, Pennsylvania (the present-day Lancaster Theological Seminary), a school they believed was increasingly heretical to traditional Reformed faith.

Two years later, the college was granted a charter by the Legislature of Pennsylvania to begin operations on the grounds of Todd's School (founded 1832) and the adjacent Freeland Seminary (founded 1848). Dr. John Bomberger, served as the college's first president from 1869 until his death in 1890. Bomberger proposed naming the college after Zacharias Ursinus, a 16th-century German theologian and an important figure in the Protestant Reformation.

In 1870, instruction began at the college in September; on October 4, the Zwinglian Literary Society was founded. For many years the annual opening meetings of "Zwing" and its rival society, Schaff, were the major events of the student year.

Women were first admitted in 1881, as a direct consequence of the closing of the Pennsylvania Female College in 1880. A separate literary society for women, The Olevian, was formed in 1885.

The town of Freeland was officially incorporated as the Borough of Collegeville in 1896. The Reading Railroad had named it that in 1869 — because of the Pennsylvania Female College; and not, as many believe, because of the then brand new Ursinus. However, in years since, the "college" in Collegeville has come to mean Ursinus.

The Ruby, Ursinus' yearbook, was first published by the Class of 1897. The name was a tribute to Professor Samuel Vernon Ruby, who collapsed as he was entering Bomberger Hall in 1896 and died in its chapel, surrounded by students and teachers who had gathered there for morning prayers.

20th Century
In 1921, the first aerial photograph of Ursinus was taken, by future college president D.L. Helfferich, and was published in the 1921 Ruby.

J.D. Salinger enrolled at Ursinus for the 1938 fall semester and only spent one semester there before leaving."In 1938, Jerome D. Salinger, described as gallant and charming, came from New York City and lived in Ursinus’s Curtis Hall. He wrote a column in the student newspaper called “The Skipped Diploma,” but did not return for spring semester. The author of The Catcher in the Rye and other works later spoke fondly of Ursinus."
At the start of the US's involvement in World War II, Ursinus' male enrolment decreased from 535 to 350 students. During the war, Ursinus made a concerted effort to bring in military students from across the country, even acquiring a Naval V-12 unit. It also accepted 3 students between 1939 and 1940 who were exiled from Austria and Germany because of the war.

In 1988, the F.W. Olin Foundation awarded a $5.37 million grant to Ursinus to construct a humanities building.

The Philip and Muriel Berman Museum of Art opened on campus in 1989.

Phi Beta Kappa invited Ursinus into its ranks in 1992. At the time, only 242 of the nation's 3,500 colleges and universities had gained acceptance into the group.

Ursinus joined the Centennial Conference at its inception in 1993, a regional athletic conference, consisting of Swarthmore College, Bryn Mawr College, Haverford College, Dickinson College, Gettysburg College, Johns Hopkins University, Franklin & Marshall College and others.

In 1995, the college appointed Dr. John Strassburger as its 12th president, the first president from outside the Ursinus alumni group. Under President Strassburger, Ursinus initiated the Summer Fellows program in which selected students worked on individualized research projects with faculty advisors. During President Strassburger's tenure as president, Ursinus became affiliated with numerous prestigious groups such as the Annapolis Group, the Watson Foundation, the Kemper Scholars group and Project Pericles.

21st Century
Ursinus College was profiled in New York Times education editor Loren Pope's popular guidebook, Colleges That Change Lives in 2006.

In 2006, the college attempted to capitalise on J. D. Salinger's brief time there by establishing a "J. D. Salinger Scholarship" which would allow a freshman to study creative writing and live in Salinger's dorm room for a year. However, the reclusive author's representatives wrote to the college within a week to ask that his name be removed. The college conceded and named it simply the College Creative Writing Award though it is known colloquially as the "Not the J.D. Salinger Scholarship.

In 2011, Ursinus was designated as a Top Ten Up and Coming College by U.S. News & World Report.

Dr. Bobby Fong, a graduate of Harvard and UCLA and former president of Butler University, began his tenure as the 13th president of Ursinus on July 1, 2011. Dr. Fong died suddenly of natural causes at his home in Collegeville in 2014. Terry Winegar, the Dean and Executive Vice President for Academic Affairs, was appointed Interim President.

Brock Blomberg, Dean of the Robert Day School of Economics and Finance at Claremont McKenna College, was named 17th president of Ursinus in 2015. Blomberg announced that he plans to depart Ursinus in September 2021 for the California Institute of Integral Studies.

Robyn Hannigan, former Provost of Clarkson University and patented inventor in the field of medical technology, was named the 19th President of Ursinus College in 2022. Hannigan began her duties on July 1, 2022.

Academics
Students can choose from 60 courses of study. Popular majors at the college are biology, English, psychology, international relations, business and economics, and health and exercise physiology.

Common Intellectual Experience
The Common Intellectual Experience (CIE) is Ursinus' unique seminar course required of all first-year students and is a requisite for the bachelor's degree. It was established in 1999. It is composed of two semester-long seminar courses that help students to figure out their degree path and their path after college. Students read from a range of philosophers and academic thinkers, and discuss them with their classmates.

In September 2012, Ursinus and Columbia University were awarded a joint grant from the Mellon Foundation to work together on the core of their seminar courses – Ursinus College's CIE, and Columbia University's Core Curriculum. The $300,000 grant will allow Ursinus faculty with prior experience teaching CIE classes to work with, and mentor, post-doctoral students at Columbia, will create post-doctoral fellowship program at Ursinus, and will also support campus visits and guest lectures from Columbia faculty who have expertise in the subject matter of CIE.

Student life
While the first students enrolled at Ursinus were almost exclusively Pennsylvanians, today the school's 1,500 students come from 35 states and 12 countries. 22% are students of color and 2% are international students. The school ranges from a 11:1 to a 10:1 student-to-faculty ratio.

Greek life
The Ursinus College Greek community consists 12 societies - 4 sororities, 5 fraternities, and 3 gender-inclusive societies. The Ursinus College Inter-Greek Council serves as the elected governing body of all social Greek organizations.

Sororities (women-only)

 Omega Chi
 Phi Alpha Psi - the oldest sorority at Ursinus College
 Sigma Sigma Sigma or Tri Sigma
 Tau Sigma Gamma

Fraternities (men-only)

 Alpha Phi Epsilon - the oldest active fraternity at Ursinus College
 Kappa Alpha Psi
 Phi Kappa Sigma
 Pi Omega Delta
 Sigma Pi (Theta Sigma chapter)

Gender inclusive societies

 Alpha Delta Phi Society
 Delta Pi Sigma fraternity
 Kappa Delta Kappa sorority (for non-male students)

Clubs and organizations
The Leadership Development and Student Activities Office provides the student body with leadership opportunities through its more than 100 student clubs and organizations. Ursinus College clubs and organizations include student government, community service, academic honor societies, political clubs and intramural sports. Ursinus is also home to a student-run newspaper, The Grizzly - the name taken from the Latin root of Zacharias Ursinus' surname (ursus translating as 'bear') - as well as The Lantern, one of the oldest, continuously produced student literary journals.

Athletics

As of 2019, 40% of Ursinus students competed on one of its athletic teams. Ursinus is a member of the Centennial Conference, founded in 1993, and which now contains eleven private colleges in the mid-Atlantic region, including Bryn Mawr, McDaniel, Johns Hopkins, Dickinson, Haverford, Franklin and Marshall, Swarthmore, Gettysburg, Muhlenberg, and Washington.

In the immediate years following its founding, there were no organized athletics at Ursinus College. Baseball matches held against neighboring towns, hiking along the Perkiomen Creek and in the nearby area that is now Valley Forge National Historical Park, and skating, bathing and boating in the Perkiomen were popular pastimes for students. In fact, students used to be able to rent canoes and fishing rods from the same location where they can now rent bikes. Students then organized a tennis club in 1888, and intercollegiate baseball began with play against Swarthmore College, Haverford College, and Muhlenberg College between 1886 and 1890. The college's first football team was also fielded in 1890 but did not play against another team until 1893 in which they lost 62–0 against Pennsylvania Military College. A field house with shower and locker facilities was first built in 1909, and a "field cage" with facilities for indoor basketball practice was built behind the field house in 1910. 

The college was well known for many years for its Patterson Field endzone, in which a large sycamore tree grew undisturbed from the 1920s. Ripley's Believe it or Not featured the famous tree for being the only one on an active field of athletic play. A new sycamore, growing since 1984 from a seedling taken from the old tree, stood nearby until a turf field project required its removal in 2011.

In 1974, the NCAA Award of Valor was presented to the 1973 basketball team. Every member of the team had entered a burning building, with their combined efforts leading to the rescue of 14 persons. In the 2003–04 season, senior shooting guard Dennis Stanton led all NCAA Men's Basketball scorers, averaging 32.6 points per game.

The Ursinus women's field hockey team has historically been very successful. During the tenure of Eleanor Frost Snell as coach of women's athletics from 1931, the "Snell's Belles" had many winning seasons. More recently they were the 2006 National Champion for NCAA Division III. The team earned spots in the national championship game three times before, between 1975 and 1977, as a Division I program, and the United States Field Hockey Hall of Fame's permanent home is at the college.

Ursinus' women's lacrosse team were the 1986, 1989, and 1990 NCAA Division III Women's lacrosse champions and the 1985, 1987, and 1991 runners-up.

In November 2019, Ursinus College canceled their Women’s and Men’s swim teams after finding that team members violated the college’s anti-hazing policy and student code of conduct. As an additional consequence, Ursinus College placed Men’s and Women’s Swim Team Head Coach Mark Feinberg on probation.

In 2020, the NCAA Division III Committee on Infractions found that a former Ursinus College Vice President and Dean of Enrollment Management improperly awarded financial aid to prospective students based on their participation in athletics and input from coaches. The committee found that approximately $335,300 in financial aid packages was improperly awarded to student-athletes over 17 sports. As a disciplinary measure, the committee publicly reprimanded Ursinus College and placed them on probation while also requiring them to attend the 2020 and 2021 NCAA Regional Rules Seminars. Additionally, Ursinus College self-imposed numerous penalties upon themselves.

Campus and facilities

SEPTA bus #93 has six stops (three southeastward, three northwestward) on Ursinus’ Campus. The route extends southeast to Norristown and northwest to Pottstown.

The nearest SEPTA regional rail line is the Manayunk/Norristown Line, which extends southeastward to Philadelphia, Pennsylvania. The closest station on the Manayunk/Norristown line to Ursinus College is the Norristown Transportation Center, located 8 miles (13km) from Ursinus College.

Notable facilities at Ursinus include:

Bomberger Memorial Hall 
Opened in 1892 and renovated in 2006. Bomberger Hall is named for John  Bomberger, the first President of Ursinus College. Bomberger Auditorium is home to the Heefner Memorial Organ, a three-manual 62-rank organ dedicated in 1986. It was a gift from Mrs. Lydia V. Heefner in memory of her husband, Russell E. Heefner.

The Philip and Muriel Berman Museum of Art 
Dedicated in 1989, located in the original Alumni Memorial Library, built in 1921, expanded in 2010. The museum program is fully accredited by the American Alliance of Museums and houses over 4,000 paintings, prints, drawings, sculpture, decorative, and cultural objects representing a broad array of art historical genres.

The Alumni Memorial Library was dedicated to the 271 Ursinus students and alumni who served in WWII including 8 who died in action. It was built upon a former boarding house.

Eger Gateway 
An iron and stone gateway erected in 1925, named for George P. Eger, father of alumnus Sherman A. Eger. The gate reads "Ursinus College" and there is a lantern atop it. Tablets inset into the gate's stone columns tell the history of Ursinus College.

Brodbeck-Wilkinson-Curtis Hall 
Brodbeck and Curtis Halls opened in 1927. Wilkinson Hall, named for Joseph C. Wilkinson, opened in 1966 connecting Brodbeck and Curtis.

Pfahler Hall & the Walter W. Marstellar Memorial Observatory 
Pfahler Hall opened in 1932, renovated and expanded in 1998. Named in honor of Dr. George E. Pfahler. Within this building Professor John Mauchly worked on the ENIAC, the world's first computer. Alumnus and Nobel Laureate Gerald Edelman also attended classes here.

The hall is built on grounds where the first women's dormitory, Olevian Hall, stood from 1865 until 1931.

In the 1950s, alumnus Walter W. Marsteller used military surplus materials and aircraft scrap to build an observatory atop the building. However, it was dismantled in the late 1990s.

The labs are equipped with a 300-MHz nuclear magnetic resonance spectrometer, Fourier-transform spectrometers, an isothermal calorimeter, gas chromatography/mass spectrometers, a voltammetric analyzer, UV visible absorbance spectrometers, high performance liquid chromatographs, an atomic absorption spectrometer, a capillary electrophoresis apparatus, a Mössbauer spectrometer, and a fluorescence spectrometer.

Beardwood-Paisley-Stauffer Hall 
Opened in 1957, jointly named in honor of Hannah Beardwood and her husband Matthew, a former chemistry professor, Dr. Harry Paisley, former president of the Ursinus board of directors, and Rev. George A. Stauffer.

Thomas Hall 
Opened in 1970 and renovated in 1991, it is the home of the Biology and Psychology departments and the following endowed laboratories: Levi Jay Hammond Laboratory of Comparative Anatomy, the W. Wayne Babcock Laboratory of General Biology, the Anna Heinly Schellhammer Laboratory, and the Parlee Laboratory.

Myrin Library 
Opened in 1971, renovated in 1988, and again in 2004–05. The old Freeland-Stine-Derr dormitory complex was demolished in 1968 to make way for the library. Myrin houses more than 420,000 volumes, 202,000 microforms, 32,000 audio-visual materials, 3,800 e-books, and offers on-site and remote access to approximately 25,900 print, microform and electronic periodical titles. The library is also one of only three U.S. Government depositories in Montgomery County, Pennsylvania and, as such, receives print and electronic federal documents for the collection.  Myrin Library is home to the Pennsylvania Folklife Society Collection (an extensive Pennsylvania German archive), the Linda Grace Hoyer Papers, the Grundy Collection on South African history, and the college's archives, the Ursinusiana Collection.

Olin Hall 
Opened in 1990, named for the F.W. Olin Foundation. Olin Hall contains a 320-seat lecture hall, a 63-seat tiered classroom, a 42-seat tiered classroom, a Writing Center, eight traditional classrooms and four seminar rooms.

Floy Lewis Bakes Center 
Dedicated in 2001 upon the expansion and renovation of Helfferich Hall, 1972. The Field House encompasses the D.L. Helfferich Hall of Health and Physical Education and the William Elliott Pool. The field house pavilion opened in 2001, while the other buildings were dedicated in 1972 in honor, respectively, of the ninth president of Ursinus College and Dr. William Elliott. Helfferich Hall now includes completely renovated locker and training rooms, and a two-story, glass-enclosed area for fitness and recreation. The physical education complex serves both men and women with three full-size basketball courts; locker rooms and team rooms; wrestling room; weight room; dance studio; classrooms; a regulation collegiate-sized swimming pool; squash and handball courts, and a gymnastics space.

Kaleidoscope Performing Arts Center 
Opened in April 2005 with a performance by jazz musician Wynton Marsalis. Within it is the Lenfest Theater, a 350-seat state-of-the-art proscenium arch theater. There is also a black box "experimental" studio theater, a box office and concession booth, a rehearsal studio, a scenic workshop, as well as teaching support space and a gallery and work space for art students.

Innovation and Discovery Center (IDC) 
Opened in October 2018. Houses the Parlee Center for Science and the Common Good and the U-Imagine Center for Integrative and Entrepreneurial Studies.

Other Buildings 

 Wismer Center, opened in 1964, named for Ralph Fry Wismer, class of 1905.
 Reimert Hall, opened in 1966, named for William D. Reimert, class of 1924.
 Corson Hall, dedicated in 1970.
 Ritter Center, opened in 1980.
 Richter-North Residence Hall, opened in 2002, named for former college President Richard P. Richter.
 New Residence Hall, opened in 2007.

Gallery

Notable people

Notable people associated with Ursinus College include:
 Gerald Edelman, Nobel Prize laureate, alumnus from class of 1950
Paul Guenther, professional football coach
 Bob Shoudt, AKA Notorious B.O.B., competitive eater, YouTuber
 Dan Mullen, college football coach, alumni and former player for the Ursinus football team
 J.D. Salinger, writer

References

External links

 Official website
 Official athletics website

 
Eastern Pennsylvania Rugby Union
Universities and colleges in Montgomery County, Pennsylvania
Educational institutions established in 1869
1869 establishments in Pennsylvania
Private universities and colleges in Pennsylvania